"Forza Bastia" is a 26-minute film documenting a UEFA Cup match between PSV Eindhoven and French club SC Bastia at the Furiani Stadium in 1978. Jacques Tati directed the piece at the request of friend Gilberto Trigano – the President of the Bastia club at that time.  It was subsequently shelved and kept in storage until Tati's daughter Sophie Tatischeff eventually assembled the footage, which was released in 2002.

External links

Films directed by Jacques Tati
French short documentary films
Documentary films about association football
SC Bastia
Films shot in Haute-Corse
Films set in Corsica
Films set in 1978
1978 in French sport
2002 short documentary films